Flor Ángel Colón (born ) is a retired Dominican Republic female volleyball player.

She was part of the Dominican Republic women's national volleyball team at the 1998 FIVB Volleyball Women's World Championship in Japan.

Career
Colón played the 1998-99 season of the Spanish top professional league, the Superliga Femenina de Voleibol with the club Caja Cantabria. She also played in Puerto Rico and the Dominican Republic with Naco, Simon Bolivar, Mirador and San Lazaro.

Clubs
 Caja Cantabria (1998–1999)

References

1969 births
Living people
Dominican Republic women's volleyball players
Place of birth missing (living people)
Expatriate volleyball players in Spain
Dominican Republic expatriate sportspeople in Spain